Donkey Hodie is an American puppet live action musical preschool television series created by David and Adam Rudman for PBS Kids, and was aimed at preschoolers ages 3 to 5. Inspired by characters created by Fred Rogers, the series premiered May 3, 2021 and is the second spinoff of Rogers' television series Mister Rogers' Neighborhood after Daniel Tiger's Neighborhood. The first full episode was initially set to premiere in winter 2021 on PBS Kids in the United States, but it was pushed back to May 3 of the same year. 

On April 7, 2022, it was announced that Donkey Hodie was renewed for a second season which will premiere in spring 2023.

Plot
In the land of Someplace Else, just north of the Neighborhood of Make-Believe, Donkey Hodie and her friends go throughout their day while solving different problems along the way.

Cast
 Haley Jenkins as Donkey Hodie, the granddaughter of Grampy Hodie (the original Donkey Hodie). Like her grandfather, her name is a pun on the novel Don Quixote.
 Stephanie D'Abruzzo as Duck Duck, Harriet Elizabeth Cow and Mama Panda.
 David Rudman as Bob Dog, Grampy Hodie, and Stanley the Dragon.
 Frankie Cordero as Purple Panda.
 Peter Linz as Clyde the Cloud.
 Matt Vogel as King Friday, the ruler of the Neighborhood of Make-Believe.
 Joey Mazzarino as Game Show Gator and Super Porcupine.
 Leslie Carrara-Rudolph as Dodie Hodie, Donkey Hodie's cousin.

The characters of Duck Duck, Clyde the Cloud, Game Show Gator, Stanley the Dragon, Super Porcupine and Dodie Hodie are new characters created for the Donkey Hodie series.

Episodes

Season 1 (2021–22)

Production 
The series was announced in January 2020. The title character is the granddaughter of the original Donkey Hodie, a character from the Neighborhood of Make Believe on Mister Rogers' Neighborhood.

Music
Like Daniel Tiger's Neighborhood, the series includes both new songs as well as songs written by Rogers.

The music for the show was composed by Bill Sherman, Zack Zeyde, and Noah Deblasis.

Home Video 
The following DVDs contain episodes of the show:

Daniel Tiger's Neighborhood: Playtime with Daniel!
"The Masked Veggies"
"The Royal Hosts"

PBS KIDS: Secret Superheroes!
"Donkey's Bad Day"
"Yodel Bird Egg"
 
PBS Kids: Just A Little Bit Spooky!
"A Donkey Hodie Halloween"

Awards and nominations

References

External links

 
 
 Donkey Hodie at Rotten Tomatoes

2020s American children's comedy television series
2021 American television series debuts
2020s preschool education television series
American children's adventure television series
American television spin-offs
American preschool education television series
American television shows featuring puppetry
Mister Rogers' Neighborhood
English-language television shows
PBS original programming
PBS Kids shows
Television series about mammals
Fictional donkeys
Television series about children
Anthropomorphic animals
Works about friendship
Farms in fiction
Forests in fiction
Television productions postponed due to the COVID-19 pandemic
Television series impacted by the COVID-19 pandemic
Television series by 9 Story Media Group